A Vicious Cycle is the fourth solo studio album by Philadelphia underground hip hop artist Reef the Lost Cauze released on November 10, 2008, by Well Done Entertainment. The album was re-released on February 10, 2009, with two new remixes of the tracks "Listen to Me" and "Get It? Got It? Good" by J.J. Brown.

Track listing

Reef the Lost Cauze albums
2008 albums